Phnom Penh Noodle House is a Cambodian restaurant in Seattle, in the U.S. state of Washington.

Description 
The menu has included beef lok lak, honey-black pepper chicken wings, mee katang, and kuyteav.

History 
The restaurant opened in 1987, serving seven noodle dishes. Following a two-year hiatus starting in 2018, Phnom Penh re-opened in August 2020, during the COVID-19 pandemic. According to Northwest Asian Weekly, Phnom Penh is the city's only Cambodian restaurant as of 2020.

Reception 
Jay Friedman included the business in Eater Seattle's 2022 list of "19 Knockout Restaurants in Seattle’s Chinatown-International District".

References

External links

 
 

Asian restaurants in Seattle
Cambodian restaurants
Chinatown–International District, Seattle